Chong Boon Single Member Constituency (Simplified Chinese: 崇文单选区;Traditional Chinese: 崇文單選區) was a single member constituency in Ang Mo Kio, Singapore. It was carved from Ang Mo Kio division prior to the 1980 elections and lasted till the 1988 elections, when it was absorbed into Cheng San Group Representation Constituency.

Member of Parliament

Elections

Elections in 1980s

References
1984 GE's result
1980 GE's result

Ang Mo Kio